Butchers is a 2020 Canadian slasher film directed by Adrian Langley, starring Simon Phillips, Michael Swatton, Julie Mainville, Anne-Carolyne Binette, Samantha De Benedet and James Gerald Hicks. "A Good Man Is Hard to Find" by Marion Harris is featured in the movie.

Summary
Two sadistic brothers have dug into the back country and, from the deep freeze of winter to the dog days of summer, anyone who crosses their path is dead meat.

Cast
 Simon Phillips as Owen Watson
 Michael Swatton as Oswald Watson
 Julie Mainville as Jenna Simpson
 Anne-Carolyne Binette as Taylor Smythe
 James Gerald Hicks as Mike Crenshaw
 Nick Allan as Willard
 Blake Canning as Steven Crane
 Samantha De Benedet as Celeste
 Jonathan Largy as Oxford
 Frederik Storm as Christopher Powell

Release
The film was released on digital on 22 February 2021 and on DVD on 8 March.

Reception
Martin Unsworth of Starburst rated the film 3 stars out of 5, writing that "While it won’t win any awards for originality, it’s a fun watch for those with a stomach and in the mood for another ‘hillbillies with a cannibal brother’ flick." Chris Cummings of Nerdly rated the film 2.5 stars out of 5, writing that "It’s nothing groundbreaking, but it’s enjoyable". Phuong Le of The Guardian rated the film 2 stars out of 5, writing that the film is "is pretty much dead meat, an amalgam of worn-out tropes unsuccessfully zombified to life." Film critic Anton Bitel wrote that while the film "is neither original nor particularly demanding viewing", it "plays out its borrowed tropes with knowing, bloody efficiency". Film critic Kim Newman wrote that while the film "throws in a few bits of eccentricity (one butcher coaching another through a Hamlet soliloquy) and frames some nice widescreen landscapes", it "defaults to how mean-spirited-can-you-get turns of plot."

References

External links
 
 

American slasher films
2020s slasher films